Rocket Lake is Intel's codename for its 11th generation Core microprocessors. Released on March 30, 2021, it is based on the new Cypress Cove microarchitecture, a variant of Sunny Cove (used by Intel's Ice Lake mobile processors) backported to Intel's 14 nm process node. Rocket Lake cores contain significantly more transistors than Skylake-derived Comet Lake cores.

Rocket Lake features the same LGA 1200 socket and 400-series chipset compatibility as Comet Lake, except H410 and B460 chipsets. It is accompanied by new 500-series chipsets as well. Rocket Lake has up to eight cores, down from 10 cores for Comet Lake. It features Intel Xe graphics, and PCIe 4.0 support. Only a single M.2 drive is supported in PCIe 4.0 mode, while all the rest are wired via PCIe 3.0.

Intel officially launched the Rocket Lake desktop family on March 16, 2021, with sales commencing on March 30. The 11th generation Core i3, as well as Rocket Lake-based Pentium Gold and Celeron CPUs were not included along with the higher-end models; instead, Intel launched refreshed models for Comet Lake Core i3 and Pentium Gold CPUs. These processors have the same characteristics as their original parts, albeit with a 100 MHz higher frequency and the last digit of their model numbers changing from zero to five. Intel also released Tiger Lake processors as part of the 11th generation lineup in the desktop/NUC and tablet market. Such processors have the new B suffix in the model names.

Features

CPU 

 Intel Cypress Cove CPU cores
 Up to 19% claimed increase in IPC (instructions-per-clock)
 DL Boost (low-precision arithmetic for Deep Learning) and AVX-512 instructions
 Compared to its predecessors, SGX instruction set extensions are removed

GPU 
 Intel Xe-LP ("Gen12") GPU with up to 32 execution units
 Fixed-function hardware for decoding HEVC 12-bit, 4:2:2/4:4:4; VP9 12-bit 4:4:4 and AV1 8K 10-bit 4:2:0
 DisplayPort 1.4a with Display Stream Compression; HDMI 2.0b
 Support for a single 8K 12-bit HDR display or two 4K 10-bit HDR displays
 Hardware accelerated Dolby Vision
 Sampler Feedback support
 Dual Queue Support
 Variable Rate Shading
 Integer- and nearest neighbor image scaling
 GPUs on desktop CPUs support 5K 60 Hz

I/O 
 Up to 20 CPU lanes of PCI Express 4.0
 DDR4-3200 memory support
 USB 3.2 Gen 2×2
 Optional USB4 / Thunderbolt 4 when paired with Intel JHL8540 Thunderbolt 4 Controller
 DMI 3.0 x8 link with Intel 500 Series Chipsets

List of 11th generation Rocket Lake processors

Rocket Lake-S (Desktop processors) 
 All CPUs listed below support DDR4-3200 natively. The Core i9 K/KF processors enable a 1:1 ratio of DRAM to memory controller by default at DDR4-3200, whereas the Core i9 non K/KF and all other CPUs listed below enable a 2:1 ratio of DRAM to memory controller by default at DDR4-3200 and a 1:1 ratio by default at DDR4-2933.
 All CPUs support up to 128 GB of RAM in dual channel mode
 Core i9 CPUs (except 11900T) support Intel Thermal Velocity Boost technology

Workstation processors 
 These CPUs support ECC memory and require Intel W480 or W580 chipset
 Support up to 128 GB of DDR4-3200 RAM in dual channel mode

Server processors 
 CPUs support ECC memory and require Intel C252 or C256 chipset
 Support up to 128 GB of DDR4-3200 RAM in dual channel mode

See also 
 List of Intel CPU microarchitectures
 Intel Core

References

External links 
 Intel 11th-generation Rocket Lake-S CPU spotted on Geekbench
 Intel’s Rocket Lake CPUs With Major New Architecture Will Boost To 5.0 GHz
 Intel Rocket Lake-S release date, specs and rumours
 Rocket Lake - Microarchitectures - Intel

Intel x86 microprocessors